Bone Symphony were a short-lived synthpop / new wave active in the early 1980s. The group consisted of Scott Wilk on lead vocals and synthesizer, Marc Levinthal (guitar, bass synthesizer and sequencer, drum machine, 808 programming) and keyboard artist Jacob Magnusson. All band members played synthesizer keyboards. They were signed to Capitol Records and released only one record, Bone Symphony EP, in 1983.

They are most famous for their song "One Foot in Front of the Other" which appeared in the films Revenge of the Nerds and Ted 2, an episode of Family Guy, Good Girls and New Girl.

Comparisons
"L.A.-based Bone Symphony takes a more conventional approach, landing somewhere between Orchestral Manoeuvers In The Dark and Real Life, and almost directly on top of Heaven 17." "The name Bone Symphony is intended to 'combine visceral aspects with intellectual ones,' and musically, that's what they succeed in doing about half the time...".

Outside projects
Outside of Bone Symphony, Wilk found a career as a composer for film and television, spanning three decades. Beginning in 1982, for an episode of CBS Afternoon Playhouse. He and Levinthal also wrote the score for the film Valley Girl, which featured Nicolas Cage in his first starring role.

Band members
 Scott Wilk – lead vocals, synthesizer
 Marc Levinthal – guitar, bass synthesizer and sequencer, drum machine, Roland TR-808
 Jacob Magnusson – keyboard

Discography
 Bone Symphony EP (1983)

Singles

Soundtrack appearances
 Revenge of the Nerds – "One Foot In Front of the Other"
 Family Guy (Don't Make Me Over) – "One Foot In Front of the Other"
 Ted 2 – "One Foot In Front of the Other"

References

External links
 

American synth-pop groups
American new wave musical groups